Adrian Marcu (born 3 December 1961) is a former professional tennis player from Romania.

Biography
Marcu, a right-handed player from Hunedoara, began touring professionally in the early 1980s. Competing on the Grand Prix circuit, he was a doubles quarter-finalist at Viña del Mar in 1982 and made his only singles main draw appearance at the 1987 Mercedes Cup held in Stuttgart. In 1988 he won a Challenger title in doubles at Sofia.

As a Romanian representative he won a bronze medal in doubles at the 1983 Summer Universiade and appeared in a total of 12 Davis Cup ties for his country, including a World Group relegation play-off against West Germany in 1984.

He is a former coach of Simona Halep. In September 2021 he was reappointed as her coach, to work alongside Daniel Dobre, after the departure of Darren Cahill.

Challenger titles

Doubles: (1)

See also
List of Romania Davis Cup team representatives

References

External links
 
 
 

1961 births
Living people
Romanian male tennis players
Romanian tennis coaches
Sportspeople from Hunedoara
Universiade medalists in tennis
Universiade bronze medalists for Romania
Medalists at the 1983 Summer Universiade
20th-century Romanian people